H. ridleyi may refer to:
 Hipposideros ridleyi, the Ridley's roundleaf bat, a horseshoe bat species found in Malaysia and Singapore
 Hohenbergia ridleyi, a Bromeliaceae plant species endemic to Brazil
 Hyperaulax ridleyi, a tropical air-breathing land snail species

See also
 Henry Nicholas Ridley